Mary Henderson may refer to:
 Mary Henderson Eastman (1818–1887), American author
 Mary Foote Henderson (1846–1931), American author, real estate developer, and social activist
Mary H. J. Henderson (1874 –1938), World War I Scottish Women's Hospital administrator, suffragist and war poet
 Mary Ellen Henderson, African-American educator and civil rights activist
 Mary Henderson (journalist), Greek-born British journalist and host

See also
 Henderson (surname)